Gasetsho Gom Gewog (Dzongkha: དགའ་སེང་ཚོ་གོངམ་) is a gewog (village block) of Wangdue Phodrang District, Bhutan.

References 

Gewogs of Bhutan
Wangdue Phodrang District